The Volkswagen Arteon is a car manufactured by German car manufacturer Volkswagen. Described as a large family car or a mid-size car, it is available in five-door liftback or estate body styles. The Arteon was unveiled on 6 March 2017, at the Geneva Motor Show, and at the Chicago Auto Show for the North American market. It is direct successor to the CC; however, Volkswagen announced that the Arteon is positioned to be more upmarket than the CC. The vehicle is based on the MQB platform.

Launch
Launched in Europe in 2017, the Arteon is positioned above the Passat, and is heavily based on the 2015 Volkswagen Arteon concept car shown at the Geneva International Motor Show. The Arteon made its debut for the United States at the 2018 Chicago Auto Show. Volkswagen delayed the launch in the United States of the Arteon due to unspecified issues with the emissions testing. Vehicles started arriving at dealerships in the US in April 2019. It became available in the Canadian market in the spring of 2019. The Arteon had multiple delays for Malaysia, only arriving to the market in August 2020. Less than a year later, in July 2021, the facelifted model was launched. However, it will be discontinued for the Canadian market after the 2021 model year due to poor sales.

Model year changes

2020
In 2020, the Arteon was given a facelift. A new shooting brake body style  and plug-in hybrid and performance Volkswagen R variants were launched.

Arteon Shooting Brake
In 2020, a five-door station wagon variant, known as the Arteon Shooting Brake, was launched.

Arteon R
It will be available only in four-wheel drive through a seven-speed DSG gearbox. Its  time is approximately five seconds. The Arteon R is available in both liftback and shooting-brake variants.

eHybrid
Available with only the 1.4L petrol engine, it offers an electric-only range of 34 miles, and a combined output of 215 bhp.

Pre-facelift styling

Post-facelift styling

Volkswagen CC post-facelift styling (China)

Arteon Shooting Brake

Volkswagen CC Shooting Brake (China)

Production
The Arteon is built in Emden, Lower Saxony, Germany. A version for the Chinese market, called the CC, is built in Changchun, China. It is also assembled in Pekan, Malaysia. The Arteon is based on Volkswagen's modular MQB platform.

Engines
In Europe, the Arteon initially featured three turbo direct injection engines at launch: a 2.0L 280PS TSI petrol engine and two diesel engines with 150PS and 240PS. Three additional engines were introduced shortly after, the 1.5L TSI Evo petrol engine with 150PS, as well a petrol and a diesel engine, both with 190PS.

In the United States, it was available in three trims — SE, SEL, and Premium — with one engine: all Arteons of 2019 will have Volkswagen's workhorse 2.0 litre turbo four, tuned to produce 268 hp and 258 lb ft of torque. Power is managed by an eight speed automatic transmission, with the choice of front or all wheel drive.

For the 2022 US-model, the Arteon got a powertrain upgrade which increased the power from 268 hp to 300 hp. In addition the 8-speed TipTronic-style automatic transmission has been upgraded to a 7-speed DSG transmission.

Transmission

Safety
The Arteon can be fitted with an optional safety system called Emergency Assist 2.0, and it takes advantage of four existing Volkswagen safety programs: Adaptive Cruise Control, Side Assist, Lane Assist and Park Assist. The Arteon will notice if a driver has not touched the accelerator, brakes or steering wheel for a certain length of time, and it will attempt to alert the person with sounds, visual cues and even a physical brake tap. If that does not work, Emergency Assist 2.0 takes over: the car's hazard lights switch on and it steers itself to a safe nearside lane. The system uses Lane Assist to recognize lines on the road and Park Assist to actually steer the car. Radar detection via Adaptive Cruise Control and Side Assist helps ensure the Arteon will not hit any other vehicles.

Euro NCAP

Awards
2017 Golden Steering Wheel Award (“midsize and premium class” category)
2019 Tow Car Awards – Overall Winner

Sales

References

External links 
 (US)

Arteon
Cars introduced in 2017
2020s cars
Mid-size cars
Hatchbacks
Station wagons
Front-wheel-drive vehicles
All-wheel-drive vehicles
Euro NCAP large family cars